Hilding Gavle (28 August 1901 – 4 August 1969) was a Swedish actor. He appeared in over forty films between 1930 and 1968.

Selected filmography
 Frida's Songs (1930)
 Kungen kommer (1936)
 Conscientious Objector Adolf (1936)
 The Andersson Family (1937)
 The Pale Count (1937)
 Adolf Saves the Day (1938)
 Between Us Barons (1939)
 Emilie Högquist (1939)
 Nothing But the Truth (1939)
 Blossom Time (1940)
 The Poor Millionaire (1941)
Lucky Young Lady (1941)
 In Paradise (1941)
 The Talk of the Town (1941)
 Only a Woman (1941)
 The Ghost Reporter (1941)
 Löjtnantshjärtan (1942)
 En trallande jänta (1942)
 Adventurer (1942)
 She Thought It Was Him (1943)
 I Am Fire and Air (1944)
 Oss tjuvar emellan eller En burk ananas (1945)
 Wandering with the Moon (1945)
 His Majesty Must Wait (1945)
 The Balloon (1946)
 Poor Little Sven (1947)
 Flickan från tredje raden (1949)
 Ett resande teatersällskap (1961)
 Hemsöborna (1966)

External links

 

1901 births
1969 deaths
Swedish male film actors
People from Kalmar
20th-century Swedish male actors